St. Aidan's Church may refer to:

Africa
 St. Aidan's Anglican Church, Johannesburg, South Africa

Europe
 St Aidan's Church, Bamburgh, England
 Church of St Aidan, Wheatley Hills, South Yorkshire, England
 St. Aidan's Church, Basford, Nottinghamshire, England
 St Aidan's Church, Billinge, Merseyside, England
 St Aidan's Church, Caythorpe, Nottinghamshire, England
 St Aidan's Church, Leeds, England
 St Aidan's Church, Oxspring, South Yorkshire, England
 St. Aidan's Church, Butlersbridge, Ireland

North America
 Church of St. Aidan (Toronto), Ontario, Canada
 St. Aidan's Church (Brookline, Massachusetts), United States
 St. Aidan's Anglican Church (Spokane, Washington), United States

See also
 St. Aidan's Cathedral, Enniscorthy, County Wexford, Ireland
 St Aidan's College (disambiguation)